Zamudin Guchev is a Circassian craftsman and musician.< He currently lives in the Republic of Adygea, and he is well known in the North Caucasus and among Circassian diaspora for preserving the ancient Circassians cultural heritage.

Zamudin established his ensemble(ZHEW) which uses the ancient Circassians musical instruments, and to be precise the Shetcha Pshen, the wood stakes, and the Circassian horn.

References

Circassian people of Russia
Living people
Year of birth missing (living people)